Events from the year 1961 in the United Kingdom.

Incumbents
 Monarch – Elizabeth II
 Prime Minister – Harold Macmillan (Conservative)
Parliament – 42nd

Events

January – March
1 January
The farthing coin, used since the thirteenth century, ceases to be legal tender in the United Kingdom.
The Conservative Monday Club is established.
Betting and Gaming Act 1960 comes into force, permitting operation of commercial bingo halls.
7 January
Members of the Soviet Portland Spy Ring are arrested in London (and charged 2 days later).
The Avengers television series first screened on ITV.
5 February – The Sunday Telegraph newspaper first published.
9 February – The Beatles at The Cavern Club: Lunchtime – The Beatles perform under this name at The Cavern Club for the first time following their return to Liverpool from Hamburg, George Harrison's first appearance at the venue. On 21 March they begin regular performances here; in June/July Stu Sutcliffe leaves the group; and on 9 November their future manager Brian Epstein sees them for the first time at The Cavern.
19 February – Police break up a demonstration outside the Belgian embassy in London protesting about the murder of the ex-Congolese Prime Minister, Patrice Lumumba.
8 March – Edwin Bush is arrested in London for the capital stabbing of Mrs. Elsie May Batten (for which he will be convicted and hanged). He is the first British criminal identified by the Identikit facial composite system.
9 March – "Water towers" speech: The Minister of Health, Enoch Powell, in a speech to a Conservative Party conference, proposes closing down of large, traditional psychiatric hospitals in favour of more community-based care.
13 March
The five members of the Portland Spy Ring go on trial at the Old Bailey accused of passing nuclear secrets to the Soviet Union.
Black and white £5 notes cease to be legal tender.
15 March – The Jaguar E-Type, a sports car capable of reaching speeds of 150 mph, is launched as a two-seater roadster or 2+2 coupé (at the Geneva Motor Show). On 3 April it makes its racing debut by winning at Oulton Park.
20 March – Shakespeare Memorial Theatre, Stratford-upon-Avon, becomes the Royal Shakespeare Theatre and its company the Royal Shakespeare Company (Peter Hall (director)).

April – June
1 April – The character Winker Watson is introduced in The Dandy comic.
17 April – Tottenham Hotspur win the Football League First Division for the second time, with a 2–1 win over Sheffield Wednesday, an achievement they do not repeat.
27 April – Sierra Leone gains independence from the UK.
1 May
Betting shops become legal under terms of the Betting and Gaming Act 1960.
A fire at the Top Storey Club in Bolton results in nineteen deaths. A new Licensing Act is rapidly passed to improve fire safety.
2 May – The United Kingdom becomes a member of the OECD.
6 May – Tottenham Hotspur becomes the first English football team this century, and only the third in history, to win the double of the league title and FA Cup, with a 2–0 victory over Leicester City in the FA Cup Final. (The last previous team to achieve this were Aston Villa in 1897.)
8 May – George Blake is sentenced to 42 years imprisonment for spying, having been found guilty of being a double agent in the pay of the Soviet Union.
17 May – Consecration of Guildford Cathedral.
28 May – Peter Benenson's article "The Forgotten Prisoners" is published in several internationally read newspapers. This will later be thought of as the founding of the human rights organisation Amnesty International.
8 June – Prince Edward, Duke of Kent, marries Katharine Worsley at York Minster.
14 June – The Government unveils new "panda" crossings with push button controls for pedestrians, due to concerns about the increasing volume of traffic. The new crossings first appear on British streets in April 1962.
19 June – The British protectorate ends in Kuwait and it becomes an emirate.
27 June
Michael Ramsey enthroned as the hundredth Archbishop of Canterbury, in succession to Geoffrey Fisher.
Kuwait requests help from the UK and British troops are sent.

July – September
4 July – Barclays open their "No. 1 Computer Centre" in Drummond Street, London, with an EMI mainframe computer, Britain's first bank with an in-house computing centre.
8 July – At an all-British women's final to The Championships, Wimbledon in tennis, Angela Mortimer beats Christine Truman.
21 July – The Runcorn Widnes Bridge (later known as the Silver Jubilee Bridge) over the River Mersey opened by Princess Alexandra.
25 July
The Government calls for a voluntary "pay pause" in wage increases (continuing to April 1962).
The Lancashire-set film Whistle Down the Wind, starring Hayley Mills and Alan Bates, opens.
3 August – Suicide Act 1961 decriminalises acts of, or attempts at suicide in England and Wales.
10 August – The UK applies for membership of the EEC.
16 August – The play Lady Chatterley by John Harte – based on D. H. Lawrence's novel – opens at the Arts Theatre in London and is well-reviewed by West End theatre critic Harold Hobson.
19–20 August – Race riots in Middlesbrough.
23 August – Police launch a manhunt for the perpetrator of the A6 murder, who shot dead 36-year-old Michael Gregsten and paralysed Valerie Storie.
25 August – Murder of Jacqueline Thomas: Police in Birmingham launch a murder inquiry after the body of a missing teenager is found on an allotment in the Alum Rock area of the city.
31 August – Premiere of the film Victim, notable as the first in English to use the word "homosexual".
September – First Mothercare shop opens, as Mother-and-Child Centre in Kingston upon Thames.
4 September – James Pitman's Initial Teaching Alphabet is tested in a number of schools.
14 September – Film A Taste of Honey, including themes of interracial relationship, unmarried pregnancy and homosexuality, is released.
16 September – Three people die and 35 are injured when a stand collapses during a Glasgow Rangers football match at Ibrox Park.
17 September – Police arrest over 1,300 protesters in Trafalgar Square during a CND rally.

October – December
October – Acker Bilk's Stranger on the Shore released.
1 October – Religious programme Songs of Praise first broadcast on BBC Television; it will still be running sixty years later.
9 October – Skelmersdale, a small Lancashire town fifteen miles north-east of Liverpool, is designated as a new town and its population will expand over the coming years, bolstered by large council housing developments to rehouse families from inner city slums on Merseyside.
10 October – A volcanic eruption on the South Atlantic British overseas territory of Tristan da Cunha causes the island's entire population to be evacuated to Surrey, where they will remain until 1963.
25 October – The first edition of Private Eye, the satirical magazine, is published in London.
8 November – In a referendum on Sunday opening of public houses in Wales, the counties of Anglesey, Cardiganshire, Caernarfonshire, Carmarthenshire, Denbighshire, Merionethshire, Montgomeryshire and Pembrokeshire all vote to stay "dry", that is, opposed to the Sunday sale of alcohol.
9 November – At the Lyceum Theatre, London, Miss United Kingdom, Welsh-born Rosemarie Frankland, becomes the first British winner of the Miss World beauty pageant.
27 November – The RAF participates in air drops of food to flood victims in Somalia.
4 December – Birth control pills become available on the NHS after their availability is backed by Health Minister Enoch Powell.
9 December – Tanganyika gains independence from the United Kingdom.

Undated
Park Hill Flats, Sheffield, opened.
Release of short documentary film Seawards the Great Ships, which will be the first Scottish film to win an Academy Award.

Publications
Agatha Christie's novel The Pale Horse.
Ian Fleming's James Bond novel Thunderball.
Richard Hughes' novel The Fox in the Attic.
John le Carré's first novel Call for the Dead, introducing the character George Smiley.
Iris Murdoch's novel A Severed Head.
Muriel Spark's short novel The Prime of Miss Jean Brodie.
Derek Tangye's first novel Gull on the Roof, first of The Minack Chronicles.
Evelyn Waugh's novel Unconditional Surrender, last of the Sword of Honour trilogy.
Raymond Williams's cultural history The Long Revolution.
Parker Morris Committee's report Homes for Today and Tomorrow.

Births

January – April
1 January 
Fiona Phillips, journalist and television presenter
Mark Wingett, British actor
2 January – Neil Dudgeon, English actor
6 January – Peter Whittle, British politician, author, journalist and broadcaster
7 January – Ian Mercer, English actor
8 January – Keith Arkell, English chess player
11 January – Jasper Fforde, fantasy novelist
12 January
Sean Blowers, actor
Simon Russell Beale, actor, born in Malaysia
13 January – Suggs, British ska singer (Madness)
16 January – Peter Tanfield, concert violinist
18 January – Peter Beardsley, English footballer and football coach
19 January – Wayne Hemingway, English designer
20 January – Janey Godley, Scottish comedian and writer
27 January – Gillian Gilbert, new wave keyboard player
31 January – Lloyd Cole, English rock singer-songwriter
14 February – Alison Saunders, Director of Public Prosecutions (England and Wales)
16 February – Andy Taylor, English rock guitarist and musician (Duran Duran)
17 February 
Angela Eagle, politician, Shadow Leader of the House of Commons
Maria Eagle, politician, Shadow Secretary of State for Transport
19 February – Justin Fashanu, black British footballer (suicide 1998)
20 February – Imogen Stubbs, British actress
24 February – John Grogan, British Labour politician
1 March – Michael Sundin, trampolinist and television presenter (died 1989)
3 March – Fatima Whitbread, British javelin thrower and Olympic medallist
12 March – Betty Sworowski, English racewalker
14 March – Marc Koska, English businessman and inventor
22 March – Giles Worsley, English architectural historian (died 2006)
26 March – William Hague, British statesman
27 March – Ellery Hanley, English rugby league footballer and coach
29 March – Michael Winterbottom, British filmmaker
1 April
 Susan Boyle, Scottish singer
 Edward Dutkiewicz, British visual artist (died 2007)
3 April – Edward Highmore, English actor
6 April – Rory Bremner, impressionist, comedian and playwright
11 April – Nigel Pulsford, rock guitarist and musician (Bush)
14 April – Robert Carlyle, Scottish actor
17 April – Bella Freud, British fashion designer and columnist
18 April – Jane Leeves, English-born actress
19 April – Richard Phelps, English pentathlete
20 April – Nicholas Lyndhurst, English actor
28 April – Grenville Davey, English sculptor

May – August
2 May
 Steve James, English snooker player
 Phil Vickery, celebrity chef
4 May – Jay Aston, English pop singer
7 May – Sue Black, forensic anthropologist
8 May – Janet McTeer, actress
12 May – Billy Duffy, English hard rock guitarist (The Cult)
14 May 
 Ian Blackford, Scottish politician
 Tim Roth, English actor
15 May – Katrin Cartlidge, actress (died 2002)
20 May – Clive Allen, footballer
28 May – Roland Gift, rock singer (Fine Young Cannibals)
30 May – Harry Enfield, English comedian
3 June – Ed Wynne, psychedelic rock guitarist (Ozric Tentacles)
5 June – Rosie Kane, member of Scottish Parliament
6 June – George Mountbatten, 4th Marquess of Milford Haven, English polo player and businessman
13 June – Bob Crow, trade union leader (died 2014)
10 June – Maxi Priest, born Max Elliott, reggae singer
14 June – Boy George (O'Dowd), English new wave singer-songwriter
15 June – Dave McAuley, Northern Irish boxer
17 June – Muslimgauze, ethnic electronica and experimental musician (died 1999)
18 June – Alison Moyet, English new wave singer-songwriter
22 June – Stephen Batchelor, English field hockey player and coach
24 June
Iain Glen, Scottish actor
Curt Smith, pop-rock singer-songwriter-keyboardist
25 June – Ricky Gervais, English comedian
27 June
Meera Syal, comic actress and writer
Tim Whitnall, English playwright, screenwriter and actor
1 July
Diana, Princess of Wales, (died 1997)
Ivan Kaye, English actor
Jefferson King, bodybuilder and wrestler
3 July – Suzanne Dando, English Olympic gymnast
5 July – Gareth Jones, Welsh television presenter
8 July –  Andy Fletcher, English musician (died 2022)
10 July – Carol Anne Davis, Scottish crime writer
12 July – Mark McGann, English actor, director, writer and musician
17 July – Jeremy Hardy, English comedian and broadcaster (died 2019)
26 July – David Heyman, English film producer (Heyday Films)
3 August – Nick Harvey, English politician
5 August – Janet McTeer, English actress
7 August
Brian Conley, English comedian, television presenter, singer and actor
Walter Swinburn, English flat racing jockey and trainer (died 2016)
8 August
The Edge (David Howell Evans), rock guitarist
Simon Weston, Welsh war hero
12 August – Lawrence (Hayward), alternative rock musician 
16 August 
Saskia Reeves, actress
Angela Smith, academic and politician
18 August – Huw Edwards, Welsh television journalist and news presenter
22 August 
 Iain Coucher, English businessman
 Roland Orzabal, English singer-songwriter (Tears for Fears)
24 August – Jared Harris, English actor

September – December
7 September – Kevin Kennedy, actor
13 September – Tom Holt, author
20 September – Caroline Flint, English Labour politician
22 September – Liam Fox, Conservative politician, Shadow Defence Secretary
24 September – Jack Dee, comedian
25 September – Steve Scott, journalist and presenter
26 September – Will Self, English novelist, reviewer and columnist
29 September – Julia Gillard, Welsh-born Prime Minister of Australia
30 September – Mel Stride, English Conservative politician
9 October – Julian Bailey, Formula 1 driver
10 October – Martin Kemp, actor and musician
11 October – Neil Buchanan, English television presenter
13 October – Rachel De Thame, English gardener and television presenter
14 October – Jim Burns, British science-fiction illustrator
16 October – Paul Vaessen, English footballer (died 2001)
20 October – Ian Rush, Welsh footballer and football manager
25 October – Pat Sharp, English radio DJ
November – Sarah Holland, romantic novelist, actress and singer
3 November – David Armstrong-Jones, Viscount Linley, chairman of Christie's U.K. auction house
4 November
Dominic Heale, journalist and newsreader 
Nigel Worthington, Northern Irish footballer and football manager
9 November 
Jill Dando, television newsreader (murdered 1999)
Jackie Kay, Scottish poet and novelist
16 November – Frank Bruno, British boxer
18 November – Steven Moffat, Scottish screenwriter
20 November – Dave Watson, English footballer
22 November – Stephen Hough, classical pianist
26 November – Karan Bilimoria, Baron Bilimoria, British Asian entrepreneur and university chancellor
28 November – Martin Clunes, actor
11 December – Marco Pierre White, British chef and restaurateur
5 December – Laura Flanders, British-born American journalist
12 December
Philip Parkin, Welsh golfer
Sarah Sutton, British actress
19 December – Matthew Waterhouse, British actor
20 December – Keith Brown, Scottish politician
23 December – Carol Smillie, Scottish television presenter
29 December – Jim Reid, Scottish alternative rock singer-songwriter
31 December
Sharon Gibson, English javelin thrower
Jeremy Heywood, Cabinet Secretary and Head of the Home Civil Service (died 2018)

Unknown dates
Sexton Ming, British artist, poet and musician
Vicki Pepperdine, English comedy actress and writer
Winsome Pinnock, black British playwright
Gerard Woodward, British novelist and poet

Deaths
26 January – Stan Nichols, English cricketer (born 1900)
30 January – John Duncan Fergusson, Scottish Colourist painter (born 1874)
4 February – Sir Philip Game, British Army officer, colonial governor and police officer (born 1876)
6 February – Lawrence Dundas, 2nd Marquess of Zetland, English politician (born 1876)
6 March – George Formby, Lancashire comic singer and performer (born 1904)
8 March – Sir Thomas Beecham, English orchestral conductor (born 1879)
12 March
Victor d'Arcy, English sprinter (born 1887)
Belinda Lee, English screen actress, killed in automobile accident in the United States (born 1935)
18 March – E. Arnot Robertson, English novelist (born 1903)
7 April – Vanessa Bell, English artist and interior designer, member of the Bloomsbury Group (born 1879)
9 April – Oliver Onions (George Oliver), English novelist and ghost story writer (born 1873)
10 April – Sir John Hope Simpson, English public servant and politician (born 1868)
13 April – Dickie Dale, English motorcycle road racer, died as result of racing accident in Germany (born 1927)
22 April – Joanna Cannan, English pony book writer and detective novelist (born 1896)
4 June – William Astbury, English physicist and molecular biologist (born 1898)
28 June – Huw Menai, Welsh poet (born 1886)
3 September – Richard Mason, English explorer, killed in Brazil (born 1934)
27 September – Bentley Purchase, London coroner (born 1890)
1 October – Sir William Reid Dick, Scottish sculptor (born 1879)
13 October
Augustus John, Welsh painter (born 1878)
John MacCormick, Scottish lawyer (born 1904)
14 October – Harriet Shaw Weaver, English political activist (born 1876)
3 November – Thomas Flynn, English Roman Catholic bishop of Lancaster (born 1880)
25 November – Adelina de Lara, English classical pianist and composer (born 1872)
24 December – Charles Hamilton, prolific English children's story writer (born 1876)

See also
 1961 in British music
 1961 in British television
 List of British films of 1961

References

 
Years of the 20th century in the United Kingdom